Leonardo Garet is a Uruguayan writer, teacher, and member of the National Academy of Uruguay.

Biography 
Leonardo Garet was born in Salto, Uruguay in 1949. He was a teacher from 1972 to 2008, mostly in private high schools Colegio y Liceo Nuestra Señora del Carmen and [Colegio y Liceo Carlos Vaz Ferreira in Salto. Also, he was Professor of Instituto de Estudios Superiores and Instituto de Filosofía Ciencias y Letras in Montevideo, Uruguay.

Garet is a poet, narrator, literary critic and cultural manager. He is the author of several books published in Uruguay and abroad. He has been a Corresponding Member of the National Academy of Uruguay since 2008.

In 2002 he received the Fraternity Award for literature.

Publications

Poetry 
Patio, Montevideo, 2012
Pentalogía, Montevideo, Ed. de autor, 1972
Primer escenario, Caracas, Venezuela, Árbol de fuego, 1975
Máquina final, Montevideo, Ed. de la Balanza, 1978
Pájaros extranjeros, Montevideo, Destabanda, 1988
Palabra sobre palabra, Montevideo, Casa de Nuna y Editores Asociados, 1991
Octubre, Montevideo Ed. de la Banda Oriental, 1994
Cantos y desencantos, Montevideo, Aldebarán, 2000
Saída de página, bilingual Spanish-Portuguese, Sant' Anna do Livramento (Brasil), Ed. de MZ Thomas y Grupo Literario de Artigas, 2001
Wörter uber Wörter (anthology), bilingual Spanish-Deutch, Ed. Instituto Cultural uruguayo-alemán, 2002
Bares en lluvia (con César Rodríguez Musmanno), Salto, Ediciones del Mercado, 2003
Vela de armas,(I don't know how to translate the title) Córdoba (R. Argentina), Ediciones Alción, 2004
La sencilla espiral de los sucesos, Montevideo, Ediciones de Hermes Criollo, 2005
El ojo en la piedra, Córdoba (R.Argentina), Ediciones Alción, 2009

Narrative 
Los hombres del agua, Montevideo, Destabanda, 1988
Los hombres del fuego, Montevideo, Ed. de la Banda Oriental, 1993
La casa del juglar, Montevideo, Ed. de la Banda Oriental, 1996
Los días de Rogelio, Montevideo, Ed. Fin de Siglo, 1998
Las hojas de par en par, Montevideo, Ediciones de la Plaza, 1998
Anabákoros, Montevideo, Fin de Siglo, 1999
80 noches y un sueño, Montevideo, Ediciones Linardi y Risso, 2004
El libro de los suicidas, Montevideo, Ediciones Cruz del Sur, 2005

Essays and literary criticism 
Cervantes, Montevideo, ed. Librería Técnica, 1976
Obra de Horacio Quiroga, 1978
Carlos Sabat Ercasty, Montevideo, ed. Kappa, 1983
Literatura de Salto, anthology and literary critics, Salto, Intendencia Municipal de Salto, 1990
La pasión creadora de Enrique Amorim, Montevideo, Editores Asociados y Casa de Nuna,1990
Vicente Aleixandre, Montevideo, Editores Asociados y Casa de Nuna, 1991
Viaje por la novela picaresca, Montevideo, Editores Asociados y Casa de Nuna, 1991
Vicente Huidobro, Montevideo, Editores Asociados, 1994
Encuentro con Quiroga, Montevideo, Academia Uruguaya de Letras y Editores Asociados, 1994
Horacio Quiroga por uruguayos –Compiler-, Montevideo, Academia Uruguaya de Letras y Editores Asociados, 1995
Cuentos completos de Horacio Quiroga, edition, prologue and notes, Montevideo, Ediciones Cruz del Sur y Ediciones De la Banda Oriental, 2002
Literatura de Artigas, anthology and literary critics, Grupo literario de Artigas, 2002
El milagro incesante, life and work of Marosa di Giorgio, Montevideo, Aldebarán, 2006.
Poesía del Litoral, Salto, Ediciones Aldebarán y Un solo litoral, Salto, 2007.
Colección Escritores Salteños. XX volumes. Intendencia Municipal de Salto y Centro Comercial de Salto.
Horacio Quiroga Obras Completas, edition, prologue and notes, Montevideo Ediciones Cruz del Sur, 2010

Translations 

Garet's stories and poems have been translated from Spanish to English, French, Portuguese, German, Italian, Dutch, Persian, Hindi, Bengali, Russian, Chinese, Guaraní and Norwegian.

Anthology 
Cuentos por Uruguayos, by Walter Rela, Montevideo, ed. Graffiti, 1994.
Poesía Uruguaya del siglo XX, de Walter Rela, Montevideo, ed. Alfar, 1995.
Cuentos fantásticos del Uruguay, Anthology by Sylvia Lago, Laura Fumagalli y Hebert Benítez, Montevideo, ed. Colihue Sepé, 1999.
Antología de poesía Latinoamericana, bilingual Spanish-Chinese, Beijing, ed. del Grupo Latinoamericano y del Caribe de Beijing y Editorial de
Investigación y Estudio de Idiomas extranjeros de la República Popular China, 1994.
Narradores y Poetas Contemporáneos, anthology by Ricardo Pallares, Montevideo, Academia Nacional de Letras y Ed. Aldebarán", 2000.
El cuento uruguayo, anthology by Lauro Maruada and Jorge Morón, Montevideo, Ediciones La Gotera, 2002.
Nada es igual después de la poesía, by Gerardo Ciancio, Montevideo, Ministerio de Educación y Cultura, 2005.
La Fraternidad de la Palabra, B'nai B'rith, Montevideo, 2005.
Muestra de poesía uruguaya, by Ricardo Pallares and Jorge Arbeleche, Academia Nacional de Letras, 2009.
Primer Congreso de poetas iraníes y del mundo,Teherán, 2009.
Antología de la Narrativa Latinoamericana de Todos los Tiempos (Persian), Teherán, 2010. Include texts by Jorge Luis Borges, Adolfo Bioy Casares, Gabriel García Márquez, Roberto Arlt, Mario Vargas LLosa, Julio Cortázar, Horacio Quiroga, Juan Carlos Onetti and Leonardo Garet among other authors.
Panorama de la narrativa fantástica uruguaya, by Lauro Marauda, Montevideo, Rumbo editorial, 2010

Awards 
First National Literature Award (Essay) for Obra de Horacio Quiroga, 1978.
First National Literature Award (Poetry) for  Saída de Página, 2002.
Fraternidad Award to literary career. B'nai B'rith Uruguay, 2002.
Junta Departamental de Salto tribute for his cultural contribution, 2002.
Julio Sosa Award for his contribution to national culture, Intendencia Municipal de Canelones, 2005.

References

External links 
 
 Academia Nacional de Letras del Uruguay Official Site

20th-century Uruguayan poets
Uruguayan male poets
Uruguayan literary critics
Literary critics of Spanish
Uruguayan essayists
People from Salto, Uruguay
1949 births
Living people
Members of the Uruguayan Academy of Language
Male essayists
21st-century Uruguayan poets
21st-century Uruguayan male writers
20th-century essayists
21st-century essayists
20th-century Uruguayan male writers
Fraternity Award